The women's rhythmic team competition at the 2010 Asian Games in Guangzhou, China was held on 25 November 2010 at the Asian Games Town Gymnasium.

Schedule
All times are China Standard Time (UTC+08:00)

Results

References

Results
Results

External links
Official website

Rhythmic Women Team